Live at PJ's is the second live album released by the funk band Kool and the Gang. The album was released in 1971, recorded at P.J.'s, a popular nightclub and music venue in West Hollywood, California from 1961 to 1973. The band's huge commercial success would not come until a few albums later.

The track "N.T." contains a widely sampled drum break which has been used in songs by such artists as Nas, Q-Tip, N.W.A, Public Enemy and Blue Boy.

Track listing 
			

The track "N.T." (short for "No Title") was replaced with "The Penguin" on the UK LP.

The 1999 CD release combined "Ike's Mood" and "You've Lost That Loving Feeling" into one track and included both "N.T." and "The Penguin".

References

Kool & the Gang albums
1971 live albums
De-Lite Records live albums